Pseudodaphnella kilburni is a species of sea snail, a marine gastropod mollusk in the family Raphitomidae.

Description
The length of the shell attains 8 mm.

Distribution
This marine species occurs off Panglao Island, South Bohol, Philippines

References

External links
 Fedosov A. E. & Puillandre N. (2012) Phylogeny and taxonomy of the Kermia–Pseudodaphnella (Mollusca: Gastropoda: Raphitomidae) genus complex: a remarkable radiation via diversification of larval development. Systematics and Biodiversity 10(4): 447-477
 Gastropods.com: Pseudodaphnella kilburni

kilburni
Gastropods described in 2012